Matthias Hauer (born 18 December 1977) is a German lawyer and politician of the Christian Democratic Union (CDU) who has been serving as a member of the Bundestag from the state of North Rhine-Westphalia since 2013.

Political career 
Hauer first became a member of the Bundestag in the 2013 German federal election. He is a member of the Committee on the Digital Agenda (since 2018) and the Finances Committee (since 2013).

In addition to his committee assignments, Hauer is part of the German Parliamentary Friendship Group for Relations with the States of Central America.

Other activities 
 Federal Financial Supervisory Authority (BaFin), Member of the Administrative Council
 Sparkasse Essen, Member of the Supervisory Board
 Bundesstiftung Magnus Hirschfeld, Alternate Member of the Board of Trustees

Political positions 
In June 2017, Hauer voted against his parliamentary group’s majority and in favor of Germany’s introduction of same-sex marriage.

Ahead of the Christian Democrats’ leadership election in 2021, Hauer publicly endorsed Armin Laschet to succeed Annegret Kramp-Karrenbauer as the party’s chair. For the 2021 national elections, he later supported Laschet as the Christian Democrats' joint candidate to succeed Chancellor Angela Merkel.

References

External links 

  
 Bundestag biography 

1977 births
Living people
Members of the Bundestag for North Rhine-Westphalia
Members of the Bundestag 2021–2025
Members of the Bundestag 2017–2021
Members of the Bundestag 2013–2017
Members of the Bundestag for the Christian Democratic Union of Germany